Chet Atkins in Hollywood is the ninth studio album recorded by American guitarist Chet Atkins, released in 1959. The title takes its name from the fact that Atkins recorded it in Hollywood. The lush string arrangements are by Dennis Farnon. Atkins later (in 1961) re-recorded this album in his home studio, using the orchestra tapes from the Hollywood session. The original LP lists Atkins as the producer, the 1961 reissue lists "... with Dennis Farnon and his orchestra" and also lists Dick Peirce as producer.

Reception

Allmusic music critic Richard S. Ginell specifically praised "Theme from Picnic" and "Jitterbug Waltz" and wrote of the album; "For some, this record might fall under the category of guilty pleasures, but a pleasure it is, one of the great make-out records of its time."

Track listing

Side one
 "Armen's Theme" (Ross Bagdasarian) – 2:12
 "Let It Be Me" (Gilbert Bécaud, Mann Curtis, Pierre Delanoë) – 3:22
 "Theme from Picnic" (George Duning) – 3:24
 "Theme from a Dream" (Boudleaux Bryant) – 3:58
 "Estrellita" (Manuel Ponce) – 2:51
 "Jitterbug Waltz" (Richard Maltby, Fats Waller) – 3:00

Side two
 "Little Old Lady" (Stanley Adams, Hoagy Carmichael) – 2:20
 "Terry Theme from Limelight" (Charlie Chaplin, Geoffrey Parsons) – 3:16
 "The Three Bells" (Bert Reisfeld, Jean Villard Gilles) – 3:06
 "Santa Lucia" (Don Titman) – 2:50
 "Greensleeves" (Traditional) – 3:05
 "Meet Mister Callaghan" (Eric Spear) – 2:23

Personnel

Chet Atkins – guitar
Jethro Burns - mandolin
Clifford Hils - bass
Howard Roberts - guitar
George Callender - bass
Jim Carney - drums
Dennis Farnon -orchestrations
Sam Albert - violin
Leonard Atkins - violin
Israel Baker - violin
Jacques Gasselin - violin
James Getzoff - violin
Murray Kellner - violin
Carl LaMagna - violin
Marvin Limonick - violin
Alfred Lustgarten - violin
Amerigo Marino - violin
Eudice Shapiro - violin
Jack Shulman - violin
Henry Sugar - violin
Robert Sushel - violin
Gerald Vinci - violin
Victor Gottlieb - cello
Edgar Lustgarten - cello
Virginia Majewski - viola
Joseph DiFiore - viola
Milton Thomas - viola
Kathyrine Julye - harp
John Cave - horn

References

1959 albums
Chet Atkins albums
Albums produced by Chet Atkins
RCA Victor albums